Cyrtonota is a genus of leaf beetles belonging to the family Chrysomelidae.

Selected species
 Cyrtonota bergeali Borowiec & Sassi, 1999
 Cyrtonota botanocharoides Borowiec, 1989
 Cyrtonota bugaensis Borowiec & Sassi, 1999
 Cyrtonota christophori Borowiec, 1998
 Cyrtonota compulsa (Spaeth, 1909)
 Cyrtonota gibbera Borowiec, 1989
 Cyrtonota lateralis (Linnaeus, 1758)
 Cyrtonota machupicchu Borowiec & Sassi, 1999
 Cyrtonota montana Borowiec, 2000
 Cyrtonota nitida Borowiec & Sassi, 1999
 Cyrtonota pyramidata (Boheman, 1850)
 Cyrtonota ricardoi Buzzi, 1998
 Cyrtonota sexpustulata = (Fabricius, 1781)

References

Cassidinae
Chrysomelidae genera